"Sunshine" is a song written by Jimmy Jam and Terry Lewis and recorded by American recording artist Alexander O'Neal. It is the sixth and final single from the singer's second solo album, Hearsay (1987). Following the successful chart performances of the Hearsay singles "Fake", "Criticize", "Never Knew Love Like This", and "The Lovers", and "(What Can I Say) To Make You Love Me", the single was released as an EP titled Sunshine and Rain. Despite its success on US radio, it was the album's poorest-selling single in the UK, peaking at #72. The song had been performed live prior to the song's release with Level 42 at the Prince's Trust Gala on 25 July 1989.

Track listing
 7" Single (655191 7)
 "Sunshine (Edit)" - 4:02
 "When The Party's Over" - 3:29

 12" Single (655191 6) / CD Single (655191 2) 
 "Sunshine (Edit)" - 4:02
 "Do You Wanna Like I Do" - 4:48
 "Crying Overtime" - 5:20
 "A Broken Heart Can Mend" - 3:40

Personnel
Credits are adapted from the album's liner notes.
 Jimmy Jam - drum and keyboard programming, keyboards, percussion
 Terry Lewis - percussion, backing vocals
 Randy Ran - backing vocals

References

External links
 

1987 songs
1989 singles
Alexander O'Neal songs
Songs written by Jimmy Jam and Terry Lewis
Song recordings produced by Jimmy Jam and Terry Lewis
Tabu Records singles